The 2008 NBA Draft was held on June 26, 2008, at the Washington Mutual Theatre at Madison Square Garden in New York City, New York. In this draft, National Basketball Association (NBA) teams took turns selecting amateur college basketball players and other first-time eligible players, including international players from non-North American professional leagues. According to the NBA, 44 players, 39 collegiate players and five international players, filed as early-entry candidates for the 2008 NBA Draft. These numbers do not include players who are automatically eligible for the draft. The Chicago Bulls, who had a 1.7 percent probability of obtaining the first selection, won the NBA Draft Lottery on May 22. The Bulls' winning of the lottery was the second-largest upset in NBA Draft Lottery history behind the Orlando Magic, who won it in 1993 with just a 1.5% chance. The Miami Heat and the Minnesota Timberwolves obtained the second and third picks respectively.

For the first time in draft history the first three draft picks were all freshmen. The Chicago Bulls used the first overall pick to draft Chicago native Derrick Rose from the University of Memphis, who later went on to win the NBA Rookie of the Year Award, making him the first player to be drafted first overall and to win Rookie of the Year since LeBron James in 2003, and also became the youngest player to win the NBA Most Valuable Player Award in 2011 at age 22. The Miami Heat used the second pick to draft Michael Beasley from Kansas State University, and the Minnesota Timberwolves used the third pick to draft O.J. Mayo from The University of Southern California. The Seattle SuperSonics used their 4th overall pick to draft Russell Westbrook, who would go on to win the 2017 NBA MVP award and is widely considered the best player in this draft. With five players taken in the draft, the University of Kansas tied University of Connecticut (2006) and University of Florida (2007) for the record with the most players selected in the first two rounds of an NBA draft until the University of Kentucky (2012) broke the record with six players drafted. Another record was set when twelve freshmen were drafted, ten of whom were drafted in the first round. Of the players drafted, 29 are forwards, 19 are guards, and 12 are centers.

The 2008 NBA Draft was the final time that the Seattle SuperSonics made an NBA Draft appearance, as well as the final time that the Sonics appeared in official media publications. In early July, the franchise relocated to Oklahoma City, Oklahoma, and was renamed the Oklahoma City Thunder. The Thunder made their first NBA Draft appearance in 2009. This draft also marked the first time that an NBA D-League player was drafted.

Draft selections

Notable undrafted players
These players were not selected in the 2008 NBA Draft but have played in the NBA.

Eligibility

Early entrants

College underclassmen
The following college basketball players successfully applied for early draft entrance.

  Joe Alexander – F, West Virginia (junior)
  Ryan Anderson – F, California (sophomore)
  Darrell Arthur – F, Kansas (sophomore)
  D. J. Augustin – G, Texas (sophomore)
  Jerryd Bayless – G, Arizona (freshman)
  Michael Beasley – F, Kansas State (freshman)
  Keith Brumbaugh – F, Hillsborough CC (sophomore)
  Mario Chalmers – G, Kansas (junior)
  Chris Douglas-Roberts – G, Memphis (junior)
  C. J. Giles – C, Oregon State (junior)
  Eric Gordon – G, Indiana (freshman)
  Jamont Gordon – G, Mississippi State (junior)
  Donté Greene – F, Syracuse (freshman)
  Kalem Grimes – F, Missouri (junior)
  Richard Hendrix – F, Alabama (junior)
  JJ Hickson – F, NC State (freshman)
  George Hill – G, IUPUI (junior)
  Reggie Huffman – F, UAB (junior)
 / Shawn James – F, Duquesne (junior)
  Davon Jefferson – F, USC (freshman)
  DeAndre Jordan – C, Texas A&M (freshman)
 / Kosta Koufos – F/C, Ohio State (freshman)
  Brook Lopez – C, Stanford (sophomore)
  Robin Lopez – C, Stanford (sophomore)
  Kevin Love – F, UCLA (freshman)
  O. J. Mayo – G, USC (freshman)
  Luc Mbah a Moute – F, UCLA (junior)
  JaVale McGee – C, Nevada (sophomore)
  Kojo Mensah – G, Duquesne (sophomore)
  Trent Plaisted – C, BYU (junior)
  Bruce Price – G, Tennessee State (junior)
  Anthony Randolph – F, LSU (freshman)
  JaJuan Robinson – G, Lincoln (Pennsylvania) (freshman)
  Derrick Rose – G, Memphis (freshman)
  Brandon Rush – G, Kansas (junior)
  Walter Sharpe – F, UAB (junior)
  Marreese Speights – F, Florida (sophomore)
  Bill Walker – F, Kansas State (freshman)
  Russell Westbrook – G, UCLA (sophomore)

International players
The following international players successfully applied for early draft entrance.

  Alexis Ajinça – C, Hyères-Toulon (France)
  Nicolas Batum – F, Le Mans (France)
  Danilo Gallinari – F, Olimpia Milano (Italy)
 / Serge Ibaka – F, L'Hospitalet (Spain)
  Ante Tomić – KK Zagreb (Croatia)

Draft Lottery

The first 14 picks in the draft belonged to teams that had missed the playoffs; the order was determined through a lottery. The lottery determined the three teams that would obtain the first three picks on the draft. The remaining first-round picks and the second-round picks were assigned to teams in reverse order of their win–loss record in the previous season. As it is commonplace in the event of identical win–loss records, the NBA performed a random drawing to break the ties on April 18, 2008.

The lottery was held on May 20, 2008, in Secaucus, New Jersey.  The Chicago Bulls, who had the ninth-worst record, won the lottery with just a 1.7% chance to win. The Miami Heat and Minnesota Timberwolves, with the worst and third-worst records, respectively, won the second and third picks.

Below were the chances for each team to get specific picks in the 2008 draft lottery, rounded to three decimal places:

Trades involving draft picks

Draft-day trades
The following trades involving drafted players were made on the day of the draft.
 Memphis acquired the draft rights to 3rd pick O. J. Mayo, along with Marko Jarić, Antoine Walker, and Greg Buckner, from Minnesota in exchange for the draft rights to 5th pick Kevin Love, along with Mike Miller, Brian Cardinal, and Jason Collins.
 Portland acquired the draft rights to 11th pick Jerryd Bayless and Ike Diogu from Indiana in exchange for the draft rights to 13th pick Brandon Rush, Jarrett Jack and Josh McRoberts. The trade was finalized on July 9, 2008.
 Toronto acquired Jermaine O'Neal and the draft rights to 41st pick Nathan Jawai from Indiana in exchange for T. J. Ford, Rasho Nesterovič, Maceo Baston, and the draft rights to 17th pick Roy Hibbert. The trade was finalized on July 9, 2008.
 In a three-team trade, Portland acquired the draft rights to 25th pick Nicolas Batum from Houston, Houston acquired the draft rights to 33rd pick Joey Dorsey from Portland and the draft rights to 28th pick Donté Greene and a 2009 second-round draft pick from Memphis, and Memphis acquired the draft rights to 27th pick Darrell Arthur from Portland.
Portland acquired the draft rights to 27th pick Darrell Arthur from New Orleans in exchange for cash considerations.
 Detroit acquired the draft rights to 32nd pick Walter Sharpe and 46th pick Trent Plaisted from Seattle in exchange for the draft rights to 29th pick D. J. White.
 Miami acquired the draft rights to 34th pick Mario Chalmers from Minnesota in exchange for two future second-round draft picks and cash considerations.
 In a three-team trade, Chicago acquired the draft rights to 36th pick Ömer Aşık from Portland, the Trail Blazers acquired a second-round draft pick in 2009 from Denver and two future second-round draft picks from Chicago, and Denver acquired the draft rights to 39th pick Sonny Weems from Chicago.
 San Antonio acquired the draft rights to 48th pick Malik Hairston, a second-round draft pick in 2009, and cash considerations from Phoenix in exchange for the draft rights to 45th pick Goran Dragić.
 Boston acquired the draft rights to 47th pick Bill Walker from Washington in exchange for cash considerations.
 Cleveland acquired the draft rights to 52nd pick Darnell Jackson from Miami in exchange for 2009 second-round draft pick.
The L.A. Clippers acquired the draft rights to 55th pick Mike Taylor from Portland in exchange for a 2009 second-round draft pick.
 Cleveland acquired the draft rights to 56th pick Sasha Kaun from Seattle in exchange for cash considerations.

Pre-draft trades
Prior to the day of the draft, the following trades were made and resulted in exchanges of draft picks between the teams.
 On August 19, 2005, Phoenix acquired 2006 and 2008 first-round draft picks and Boris Diaw from Atlanta in exchange for Joe Johnson. Phoenix used the pick to draft Robin Lopez.
 On June 25, 2008, Charlotte acquired the 20th draft pick from Denver in exchange for a future conditional first-round draft pick. Charlotte used the pick to draft Alexis Ajinça.
 On February 19, 2008, New Jersey acquired 2008 and 2010 first-round draft picks, Devin Harris, Trenton Hassell, Maurice Ager, DeSagana Diop, and Keith Van Horn from Dallas in exchange for Jason Kidd, Antoine Wright and Malik Allen. New Jersey used the pick to draft Ryan Anderson.
 On July 20, 2007, Seattle acquired 2008 and 2010 first-round draft picks and Kurt Thomas from Phoenix in exchange for a 2009 second-round draft pick. Seattle used the pick to draft Serge Ibaka.
 On February 1, 2008, Memphis acquired 2008 and 2010 first-round draft picks, the draft rights to Marc Gasol, Kwame Brown, Javaris Crittenton, and Aaron McKie from the L.A. Lakers in exchange for Pau Gasol and a 2010 second-round draft pick. Memphis used the pick to draft Donté Greene.
 On January 26, 2006, Minnesota acquired Boston's 2006 and Miami's 2008 second-round draft picks, Ricky Davis, Marcus Banks, Justin Reed and Mark Blount from Boston in exchange for Wally Szczerbiak, Michael Olowokandi, Dwayne Jones and a future first-round draft pick. Previously, Boston acquired 2006 and 2008 second-round draft picks, Qyntel Woods and the draft rights to Albert Miralles from Miami in a five-team trade on August 8, 2005. Minnesota used the pick to draft Nikola Peković.
 On June 28, 2006, Portland acquired a 2008 second-round draft pick from Memphis in exchange for the draft rights to Alexander Johnson. Portland used the pick to draft Joey Dorsey.
 On June 28, 2007, Portland acquired a 2008 second-round draft pick, Steve Francis and Channing Frye from New York in exchange for Zach Randolph, Dan Dickau, Fred Jones and the draft rights to Demetris Nichols. Portland used the pick to draft Ömer Aşık.
 On February 16, 2008, Sacramento acquired a 2008 second-round draft pick, Anthony Johnson, Tyronn Lue, Shelden Williams, and Lorenzen Wright from Atlanta in exchange for Mike Bibby. Sacramento used the pick to draft Sean Singletary.
 On June 6, 2005, Utah acquired a 2008 second-round draft pick from Philadelphia in exchange for the 60th draft pick in the 2005 Draft. Utah used the pick to draft Ante Tomić.
 On June 28, 2007, San Antonio acquired a 2008 second-round draft pick from Toronto in exchange for the draft rights to Giorgos Printezis. San Antonio used the pick to draft Goran Dragić.
 On June 28, 2007, Seattle acquired Portland's 2008 second-round draft pick, Wally Szczerbiak, Delonte West and the draft rights to Jeff Green from Boston in exchange for Ray Allen and the draft rights to Glen Davis. Previously, Boston acquired a 2008 second-round draft pick, Sebastian Telfair and Theo Ratliff on June 28, 2006, from Portland in exchange for Raef LaFrentz, Dan Dickau and the draft rights to Randy Foye. Seattle used the pick to draft Trent Plaisted.
 On September 17, 2002, Phoenix acquired a 2008 second-round draft pick from Cleveland in exchange for Milt Palacio. Phoenix used the pick to draft Malik Hairston.
 On February 23, 2006, Seattle acquired a 2008 second-round draft pick, Earl Watson and Bryon Russell from Denver in a four-team trade. Seattle used the pick to draft DeVon Hardin.
 On June 7, 2007, Miami acquired 2007 and 2008 second-round draft picks from Orlando as part of the hiring of Stan Van Gundy as Orlando's head coach. Miami used the pick to draft Darnell Jackson.
 On February 21, 2008, Houston re-acquired their 2008 second-round draft pick along with Bobby Jackson and Adam Haluska from New Orleans in a three-team trade. Previously, Houston and New Orleans agreed to exchange second-round draft picks in a trade that sent Kirk Snyder to Houston on July 14, 2006. Houston used the pick to draft Maarty Leunen.
 On June 28, 2006, Portland acquired Indiana's 2007 and Phoenix's 2008 second-round draft picks and the draft rights to Alexander Johnson from Indiana in exchange for the draft rights to James White. Previously, Indiana acquired a 2008 second-round draft pick on August 25, 2005, from Phoenix in exchange for James Jones. Portland used the pick to draft Mike Taylor.
 On June 28, 2007, Seattle acquired New Orleans' 2008 second-round draft pick and cash considerations from Houston in exchange for the draft rights to Carl Landry. Previously, Houston and New Orleans agreed to exchange second-round draft picks in a trade that sent Kirk Snyder to Houston on July 14, 2006. Seattle used the pick to draft Sasha Kaun.

See also
 List of first overall NBA draft picks

References
General

Specific

External links

NBA Draft – 2008 NBA Draft – ESPN

Draft
National Basketball Association draft
NBA draft
NBA draft
2000s in Manhattan
Basketball in New York City
Sporting events in New York City
Sports in Manhattan
Madison Square Garden